Robert Schnee is an American politician who was elected to serve as a member of the Pennsylvania House of Representatives from the 116th district on April 5, 2022.

Career 
Schnee has served as a member of the Luzerne County Council since 2016. In April 2019, he was criticized after describing Luzerne County as "like the black child here" during a council work session on county roads. Schnee later issued an apology for the comment while maintaining that the comparison was not intended to be disrespectful.

Schnee was a meter reader for the Hazleton City Authority in Hazleton, Pennsylvania. He was elected to the Pennsylvania House of Representatives in an April 2022 special election to replace Tarah Toohil.

Election history

2015 Luzerne County Council election

2019 Luzerne County Council election

|-
! style="background-color: #800080; width: 2px;" |
| style="width: 130px" | Democratic/Republican
|               | Robert W. Schnee (incumbent)
| align="right" | 28,588
| align="right" | 11.02
|-

2022 Pennsylvania House special election

References 

Living people
Republican Party members of the Pennsylvania House of Representatives
People from Hazleton, Pennsylvania
People from Luzerne County, Pennsylvania
Year of birth missing (living people)